The Los Barrios Power Plant coal-fired power station is based on the Rankine Cycle. It is located in the municipality of Los Barrios in southern Spain, next to the Gibraltar-San Roque Refinery.

The plant is kept in reserve for Spain's electricity grid. It provides direct employment to over 200 employees and it has a capacity of 567.5 MW.

References

External links 

Coal-fired power stations in Spain
Los Barrios